Walter Ray Furnace (born December 31, 1943) is an American politician and businessman.

Background
Furnace was born in Ennis, Texas and graduated from the George Carter High School. He served in the United States Air Force. He settled in Anchorage, Alaska and received his bachelor's in business administration from University of Alaska Anchorage in 1972. He also went to the Gambell Street Business School and the Western CUNA Management School. Furnace was involved in the banking business in Anchorage. Furnace served on the Anchorage School Board and was president of the school board. He was a Republican. Furnace served in the Alaska House of Representatives from 1982 to 1990.

References

1943 births
Living people
African-American bankers
American bankers
African-American state legislators in Alaska
Businesspeople from Anchorage, Alaska
Republican Party members of the Alaska House of Representatives
Military personnel from Texas
People from Ennis, Texas
Politicians from Anchorage, Alaska
School board members in Alaska
University of Alaska Anchorage alumni
21st-century African-American people
20th-century African-American people